The 1964 Nobel Prize in Literature was awarded the French writer Jean-Paul Sartre (1905–1980) "for his work which, rich in ideas and filled with the spirit of freedom and the quest for truth, has exerted a far-reaching influence on our age." 

Sartre declined the prize, saying that he never accepted any official honours and that he did not want the writer to become an institution. The Swedish Academy said in announcement: "It will be recalled that the laureate has made it known that he did not wish to accept the prize. The fact that he has declined this distinction does not in the least modify the validity of the award. Under the circumstances, however, the Academy can only state that the presentation of the prize cannot take place." It is the only known occasion when a Laureate has voluntarily declined to accept the Nobel Prize in literature.

Laureate

Sartre was a philosopher – formulated and popularized the philosophy existentialism largely formed in his Being and Nothingness ("L'Être et le néant", 1943) – and playwright but also wrote novels and short stories. Through the protagonist Antoine Roquentin, his first novel La Nausée ("Nausea", 1938) articulates the existentialist themes of alienation, devotion and loneliness. His play Huis Clos ("No Exit", 1944) depicts hell as a perpetual co-existence with other people, while Les Mouches ("The Flies", 1943) is an adaptation of the ancient Electra myth. His autobiography Les Mots ("The Words", 1964), in which the author tries to distance himself from his writing and reconstruct his childhood, was received with great acclaim when it came out.

Deliberations

Nominations
Sartre received 16 nominations since 1957. In 1964, the Swedish Academy received two nominations for him with which he was eventually awarded. He was nominated by the Swedish PEN-Club and a professor of German language from the University of Strasbourg. Sartre was included in the shortlisted nominees together with Russian novelist Mikhail Sholokhov (awarded in 1965) and British writer W. H. Auden.

76 individuals were nominated for the Nobel Prize in literature in 1964. 19 of them were nominated first-time, among them Eugène Ionesco, Paul Celan, José María Pemán, Hossein Ghods-Nakhai, James Thomas Farrell, Camilo José Cela (awarded in 1989), Harry Martinson (awarded in 1974), Hugh MacDiarmid, and Miguel Ángel Asturias (awarded in 1967). The highest number of nominations – 3 nominations each – were for Väinö Linna, Friedrich Dürrenmatt, André Malraux, and Mikhail Sholokhov (awarded in 1965). Four of the nominees were women: Judith Wright, Ina Seidel, Nelly Sachs (awarded in 1966, and Katherine Anne Porter.

The authors Halide Edib Adıvar, Abbas Mahmoud al-Aqqad, Brendan Behan, Angel Cruchaga Santa María, Wenceslao Fernández Flórez, Ian Fleming, Réginald Garrigou-Lagrange, Vassily Grossman, Ben Hecht, Thakin Kodaw Hmaing, Samuil Marshak, Moa Martinson, Flannery O'Connor, Karl Polanyi, Davíð Stefánsson, Păstorel Teodoreanu, Ion Vinea, Felix Weltsch, T. H. White, María Wiesse Romero, Helen Wodehouse, and Madeleva Wolff died in 1964 without having been nominated for the prize.

Prize Decision
On 17 September 1964 the Nobel committee proposed that the prize should be awarded to Jean-Paul Sartre. The second name on the list was Mikhail Sholokov (who was awarded the prize in 1965) and the third name was W.H. Auden. There was some ambivalence within the Swedish Academy to award Sartre. He had been nominated the first time in 1957, but his candidacy was postponed for the future as the Academy was not sure if Sartre's work would have any historical importance. His candidacy was considered and postponed again in 1962 for similar reasons. The publication of Les Mots in 1963 is believed to have strengthened Sartre's candidacy and in October 1964 the Academy decided to award Sartre, their decision was sealed with a final vote on 22 October 1964. A week earlier Sartre, knowing that he was a candidate for the prize, had sent a letter to the Swedish Academy saying he would not accept the award, but as the Academy had already made their decision before the formal final vote they disregarded the letter. The Academy's permanent secretary Karl Ragnar Gierow replied to Sartre's letter saying that the decision had already been made and urged Sartre to reconsider and accept the prize.

Reactions
In a text published in Le Figaro on 23 October 1964 Sartre wrote that he regretted that his refusal to accept the prize had caused a scandal. He explained that he never accepted any prizes or membership of institutions as he believed an author who accepted such things became forever associated with the prize or institution, and that the author should not allow himself to become an institution.

Aftermath
In his memoirs Lars Gyllensten claimed that someone, either Sartre himself or someone related to him, in 1975 had contacted the Swedish Academy and asked if the prize money was available.

References

External links
List of all nominations for the 1964 Nobel Prize in literature nobelprize.org

Jean-Paul Sartre
1964